The Slovenian Junior League (Slovenian: Slovenska mladinska liga), also known by the abbreviation 1. SML, is the top level of Slovenian youth football in its age category. The league is contested among the under-19 sides of Slovenian football clubs and is governed by the Football Association of Slovenia. Maribor is the most successful team with seven championships.

Current teams
As of the 2022–23 season

Aluminij
Bravo
Brinje Grosuplje
Celje
Domžale
Gorica
Ilirija 1911
Koper
Krka
Maribor
Mura
Nafta 1903
Olimpija Ljubljana
Radomlje

List of winners

References

External links
1. SML at NZS website 

Under
Youth football in Slovenia
1990 establishments in Slovenia